Treniota (Troniata; c. 1210–1264) was the Grand Duke of Lithuania (1263–1264).

Treniota was the nephew of Mindaugas, the first and only king of Lithuania. While Mindaugas had converted to Christianity in order to discourage Livonian Order and Teutonic Knights attacks on Lithuania, becoming king in the process, Treniota remained a staunch pagan. It is believed that Treniota was trusted to rule Samogitia.

Despite Mindaugas's conversion, the Teutonic Knights regularly made incursions in Lithuanian territory. After the Battle of Durbe in 1260, Treniota convinced Mindaugas to relapse from Christianity and attack the Teutonic Order, though the attack was ineffective and the Teutonic Knights were barely weakened. Mindaugas began to question his alliance with Treniota. However, before he was able act against his pagan nephew, Treniota together with Daumantas assassinated Mindaugas and two of his sons in 1263. Treniota usurped the throne and reverted the nation to paganism. However, he only ruled for a year before being deposed by Vaišvilkas, the younger son of Mindaugas.

See also 
House of Mindaugas – family tree of Treniota
List of Lithuanian rulers

References
 

1264 deaths
13th-century Lithuanian nobility
Grand Dukes of Lithuania
Year of birth unknown
Year of birth uncertain